Alibaba and the Thief is a 2015 Chinese animated children's adventure film directed by Zheng Chengfeng. It was released in China on May 23, 2015.

Voice cast
Ye Fang
Ding Yan
Zhang Yang
Wu Rui
Yang Yang
Wang Qi
Sun Ke
Zhang YuanZhong
Wang Xueqin
Wang Yalin
Lu Yao

Box office
By May 23, 2015, the film had earned  at the Chinese box office.

Sequels
Alibaba and the Thief was followed by two sequels, Alibaba 2: Seal of Solomon in 2016 and Alibaba and the Three Golden Hair in 2018.

References

2010s adventure films
2015 animated films
2015 films
Animated adventure films
Chinese animated films
Chinese children's films